Cowpea mild mottle virus (CPMMV) is a plant pathogenic virus of the family Betaflexiviridae that infects yardlong beans, soybeans and peanuts. It is transmitted by whiteflies that feed on the underside of plant leaves. Symptoms of infection include leaf malformation and mosaic, or spotted, patterns on the leaves.  According to the Handbook of Plant Virus Diseases, the pathogen is found in "China, India, Indonesia, Ivory Coast, Nigeria, Thailand, Philippines, Papua New Guinea [and] Sudan".

References

External links
ICTVdB - The Universal Virus Database: Cowpea mild mottle virus
Family Groups - The Baltimore Method

Carlaviruses
Viral plant pathogens and diseases